Vanilla humblotii is a species of orchid endemic to Madagascar and the island of Grande Comore in the Comoros Islands. They are an endangered species, with a low population caused by anthropogenic activity. They live on dry, rocky mountains and in mesophilous forests. Vanilla humblotii have no leaves and are characterized by canary yellow flowers with a red velvet lip. They are known to have applications in medicine due to its antimicrobial properties, so it is important to protect them for future use.

References

External links

humblotii
Orchids of Africa
Orchids of Madagascar
Flora of the Comoros